Kidds Store is an unincorporated community in extreme northeastern Casey County, in the U.S. state of Kentucky near the intersection of KY 906 and U.S. Route 127.

History
It was named for the community's first postmaster, Elias Kidd. He also ran a store and gristmill in the area. The post office operated from 1887 to 1954.

References 

Unincorporated communities in Casey County, Kentucky
Unincorporated communities in Kentucky